George Harry Booth-Grey, 7th Earl of Stamford and 3rd Earl of Warrington (7 January 1827 – 2 January 1883) was an English cricketer, landowner and peer, who sat on the Whig benches in the House of Lords.

Early life

George Harry Booth-Grey was born at Enville, Staffordshire, the only son of George Grey (1802–1835), who as Lord Grey of Groby had been summoned by writ to Parliament in 1832. He succeeded to that title (created 1603) as 9th Baron Grey of Groby at the death of his father on 24 October 1835.

He was educated at Eton (1840–1843) before going up to Trinity College, Cambridge for one year. On the death of his grandfather George Harry Grey on 26 April 1845, he succeeded to the titles of Earl of Stamford, Earl of Warrington and Baron Delamer of Dunham Massey.

Activities
A member of Marylebone Cricket Club (MCC), Stamford played in eight first-class matches between 1851 and 1858, making 81 first-class runs at an average of 7.36, with a highest score of 17, and holding two catches.

A prominent patron of The Turf, he was Master of the Quorn Hunt between 1856 and 1863, and whilst he did not have many notable successes with his racehorses, his colt Diophantus won the Two Thousand Guineas in 1861.

He served as a captain in the Cheshire Yeomanry (1845–56), before being appointed Honorary Colonel of the 7th Battalion, Lancashire Rifles (Volunteers) in 1871.

Marriage and legacy

Lord Stamford and Warrington married twice, producing no children; firstly in 1848 to Elizabeth King Billage (daughter of a shoemaker at Cambridge ) and secondly in 1855 to Catherine Cox the daughter of Henry Cox Esq.

After inheriting his family's large estates at Enville in Staffordshire, Bradgate Park in Leicestershire and other Leicestershire estates (including the village of Groby), Dunham Massey in Cheshire, and Stalybridge in Lancashire, he commissioned the building of St Margaret's Church at Dunham Massey in 1851. Built in honor of his sister, Lady Margaret Milbank, the church was completed in 1855. He was patron of several advowsons in addition to lordships of manors.

Following his second marriage to Catherine Cox, the Earl commissioned the architect, Mr. M.J. Dain of Dain and Parsons, London, to design a hall for him to replace the old hunting lodge the Grey's used in the village of Groby, Leicestershire during the hunting season, which was named Bradgate House. Built by local builder Thomas Rudkin, Bradgate House was completed in 1856 and was built in the Jacobean style. It has been referred to as the Calendar House because it had 365 windows, 52 rooms, and 12 main chimneys.  Groby. In 1860, twelve farms of his land at Bradgate were submerged to form Cropston Reservoir. In 1879, he donated  of his land at Stalybridge to the local council as a public park (Stamford Park) and sold further land for housing development.

On his death at Bradgate House in 1883, the earldom of Warrington (cr. 1796) became extinct. His other two titles passed to his third cousin once removed, The Revd Harry Grey, 8th Earl of Stamford, who was living in Cape Colony.

He left his estates to his widow for life, who was then styled Dowager Countess of Stamford and Warrington, and on her death in 1905 they were divided. The Dunham Massey estate went with the earldom; the Leicestershire estates passed to his niece Mrs Arthur Duncombe (later Grey), and the Enville estate was inherited by the Dowager Countess's grandniece Catherine, wife of Sir Henry Foley Lambert. The land at Stalybridge was left equally between Mrs Duncombe and the Earl of Stamford and Warrington's niece and Lady Lambert the grand niece of Catherine, Countess of Stamford and Warrington, whose descendants (Deramore and Foley Grey respectively) settled its division in 1959.  Mrs Duncombe sold the Leicestershire Estates in 1925, which included the village of Groby and also the Jacobean style hall the Earl of Stamford and Warrington commissioned at Groby and was completed in 1856. Bradgate House was demolished in 1926. Only the magnificent stable block survives, albeit in a ruinous and dilapidated condition, which had been built on a lavish scale (the bill is thought to have run to £30,000) for the 7th Earl of Stamford when he was made Master of the Quorn Hunt in 1856.

Arms

See also 
 Dunham Massey
 Earl of Warrington

References

External links
 www.burkespeerage.com
 www.cracroftspeerage.co.uk

|-

1827 births
1883 deaths
19th-century English nobility
George
People from Cheshire
People from Hinckley and Bosworth (district)
People educated at Eton College
Alumni of Trinity College, Cambridge
Marylebone Cricket Club cricketers
North v South cricketers
Gentlemen of England cricketers
English cricketers of 1826 to 1863
English cricketers
British racehorse owners and breeders
Masters of foxhounds in England
Whig (British political party) politicians
British Anglicans
People of the Victorian era
Cheshire Yeomanry officers
Earls of Stamford
Earls of Warrington
People from South Staffordshire District
Gentlemen of Marylebone Cricket Club cricketers
Barons Grey of Groby